"Remember the sabbath day, to keep it holy" (Hebrew:  zāḵōr ’eṯ-yōm haš-šabbāṯ lə-qaddəšōw) is one of the Ten Commandments found in the Torah.

The full text of the commandment reads:

Background
According to the biblical narrative when God revealed the Ten Commandments to the Israelites at biblical Mount Sinai, they were commanded to remember the Sabbath and keep it holy by not doing any work and allowing the whole household  to cease from work. This was in recognition of God's act of creation and the special status that God had conferred on the seventh day during the creation week.

Ancient understanding
The Torah portrays the Sabbath concept both in terms of resting on the seventh day and allowing land to lie fallow during each seventh year.  The motivation is described as going beyond a sign and remembrance of Yahweh's original rest during the creation week and extends to a concern that one's servants, family, and livestock be able to rest and be refreshed from their work.  In addition to the instruction to rest on each seventh day and seventh year, periods of seven days are often relevant aspects of Biblical instructions. For example, the quarantine period for suspected skin diseases after initial examination by a priest was seven days, after which the priest would re-examine the skin and pronounce the person clean or unclean.  Other special days included the day after the seventh Sabbath, the first day of the seventh month, the day of ritual cleansing after being healed from an unclean disease or other event bringing uncleanness.  In addition, in the battle of Jericho, Joshua commanded the army to march around Jericho each day for seven consecutive days and to march around Jericho seven times on the seventh day.

The Torah describes disobedience to the command to keep the Sabbath day holy as punishable by death and failing to observe Sabbath years would be compensated for during the captivity that would result from breaking covenant.  The Torah also describes how special bread was to be set out before Yahweh Sabbath by Sabbath and describes Sabbath day offerings.

The Day of Atonement was regarded as a "Sabbath of Sabbaths"   It was on this day alone that the Kohen Gadol (High Priest) entered the Kodesh Hakodashim (Most Holy Place) inside the Tabernacle where the Ark of the Covenant contained the stone tablets on which the Ten Commandments were engraved.  The presence of YHWH in the Kodesh Hakodashim on that yearly day, upon the mercy seat, required that the Kohen Gadol be first purified by the sacrifice of a bull in a prescribed manner.  Entering the Most Holy Place on other days or without fulfilling the ritual requirements would subject  the priest to death.

In the same way that observing the Sabbath did not prevent Joshua from marching around Jericho for seven consecutive days, Sabbath observance did not prevent the chief priest Jehoiada from organizing a palace coup on the Sabbath in order to remove queen Ataliah from the throne and replace her with Joash, a rightful heir to the throne.  Ataliah had murdered all the other heirs to the throne upon the death of Ahaziah and usurped the throne of Judah for herself.  Jehoiada's wife had rescued young Joash, and Jehoiada had kept him hidden for six years while Ataliah reigned as queen over Judah.  The priest Jehoiada used the occasion of the transfer of the guard on the Sabbath to proclaim Joash as king because at that time, he could arrange twice the normal guard on duty at the temple of Yahweh.  On that day, a covenant was made, Joash was proclaimed king, Ataliah was put to death, the temple of Baal was torn down, idols were smashed, and Mattan, the priest of Baal, was killed.

A number of the prophets condemn desecration of the Sabbath with various forms of work, including Isaiah, Jeremiah, Ezekiel, and Amos.  According to Nehemiah, after the captives return to Jerusalem from Exile, they make a covenant which includes a promise to refrain from desecrating the Sabbath, yet some give in to the ongoing temptation to buy and sell on the Sabbath.  As a result, Nehemiah has to rebuke them and station guards to prevent commerce in Jerusalem on the Sabbath.

Jewish view

Ibn Ezra taught that the Exodus account of the Ten Commandments contains the text exactly as written on the stone tablets and that the different version in Deuteronomy contains Moses' words which remind Israel to obey the commandments, "as the  your God has commanded you."  Ibn Ezra explains that Moses did not need to re-iterate the reference to six days of creation at the beginning of the commandment in Deuteronomy, because the command in Deuteronomy itself refers back to the command from Exodus with the words "as YHWH your Elohim has commanded you."  Instead, Moses revealed in Deuteronomy the motive for the command that slaves rest on the Sabbath day in order that Israel remember that they were slaves in Egypt  and that God redeemed them.

Rabbi Moshe ben Nachman (the Ramban) also views the Exodus version of the Sabbath day commandment as a direct recitation by God, and the version in Deuteronomy as Moses’ personal reconstruction and exposition.  The Ramban explains that Moses wishes to emphasize that the prohibition of work extends even to agricultural work aimed at food production.  He further explains the difference in the stated rationals (creation in Exodus, exodus in Deuteronomy).  The exodus from Egypt serves as further evidence of Yah's creation of the world.  God's awesome display of power during the exodus annuls any doubts regarding YHWH as creator, because only the creator can possess such total control over the elements.

Maimonides (the Rambam) gives equal footing to both rationales for the Sabbath command:

Christian view

New Testament

Moral imperatives mirroring nine of the Ten Commandments are repeated in the New Testament, but the commandment regarding the Sabbath is notably absent.  However, the background and Jewish understanding of the Sabbath commandment underscore much of the New Testament narratives and discussion.  For example, Jesus is described as pointing out to the Jews their misunderstanding of the Mosaic Law by making observance of the Sabbath more rigorous than God had commanded.  It was not unlawful to eat on the Sabbath, even if food must be obtained by plucking grain from the ears.  It was not unlawful to do good on the Sabbath day.  Healing was a work of mercy, and Jesus, portrayed as Lord of the Sabbath, was merciful.  Consequently, criticisms of healing on the Sabbath were unjustified.

Catholic views   
The Catholic Church views the commandment to "remember the Sabbath day and keep it holy" (Exodus 20:8-10) as an essential part of observing the command to "love the Lord your God with all your heart, and with all your soul and with all your mind."(Mark 2:27-28)  Catholic teaching emphasizes the holiness of the Sabbath day (Exodus 31:15), connects the Sabbath with God's rest after the six days of creation (Exodus 20:11), views the Sabbath as a reminder of Israel's liberation from bondage (Deuteronomy 5:15), and views God's example of resting on the seventh day as an example for human resting and protesting the servitude of work and the worship of money. (Exodus 31:17, 23:12)  The Catechism of the Catholic Church discusses many incidents when Jesus was accused of violating the Sabbath law, and points out that Jesus never fails to respect the holiness of this day. (Mark 1:21, John 9:16) Jesus is described as giving the Sabbath law its authentic and authoritative interpretation: "The sabbath was made for man, not man for the sabbath." (Mark 2:27)   With compassion, Christ declares the Sabbath for doing good rather than harm, for saving life rather than killing.(Mark 3:4)

Sunday is distinguished from the Sabbath, which it follows.  According to Catholic teaching, ceremonial observance of Christ's resurrection on the first day of the week replaces that of the Sabbath.

Sunday is described as a fulfillment of the spiritual truth of the Jewish Sabbath and an announcement of man's eternal rest in God.  The Catholic Catechism describes Sunday celebration as observing  the "moral commandment inscribed by nature in the human heart to render to God an outward, visible, public, and regular worship."  Thus, Sunday worship fulfills the "moral command of the Old Covenant, taking up its rhythm and spirit in the weekly celebration of the Creator and Redeemer of his people."
The Catholic Church teaches that the Lord's day should be "a day of grace and rest from work" to cultivate their "familial, cultural, social, and religious lives."   On Sundays and other holy days, faithful Christians are to refrain from work and activities that hinder the worship owed to God, the joy proper to the Lord's Day, works of mercy, and the "appropriate relaxation of mind and body."  Christians also sanctify Sunday by giving time and care to their families and relatives, often difficult to do on other days of the week. "Sunday is a time for reflection, silence, cultivation of the mind, and meditation which furthers the growth of the Christian interior life."  In addition to one's own rest, Christians should avoid making unnecessary demands on others that would hinder them from observing the Lord's Day.

An oration given by Jesus to Saint Elizabeth, Queen of Hungary, along with Saint Matilda and Saint Bridget, titled "A True Letter of Our Saviour Jesus Christ", which is venerated by Roman Catholics, implores the faithful: "If you want to reap an abundant harvest you must not work on Sunday, for Sunday you must go to Church and pray to God to forgive your sins. He gave you six days in which to work and one for rest and devotion and to tender your help to the poor and assist the Church."

Lutheran views
Martin Luther taught that with regard to external observance, the Sabbath commandment was given to Jews alone and not strictly applicable to Christians.  Luther did see wisdom in voluntary observance of a day to rest from labor and pay particular attention to Christian duties of reading the Scriptures, worshiping God, and prayer.  He thought that this need not occur on any particular day, but should continue on Sunday (the Lord's day), since this was the long established practice, and there was no reason to create disorder by unnecessary innovation.  Luther emphasized that no day is made holy by rest alone, but rather by the individual seeking to be holy through washing himself in God's word.

From Martin Luther there is also the following comments on the reason for, importance of, and continuing need for the seventh-day Sabbath, specifically, found in Luther on the Creation: A Critical and Devotional Commentary on Genesis 1-3:

Here one does not find Luther saying the Sabbath command of Genesis 1 is something that could be dispensed with.  It was the command of the Creator of the universe and had a specific purpose.

Reformed views 
John Calvin taught that since Jesus Christ fulfilled the Sabbath, binding observance to the Sabbath was abrogated for Christians.  However, he emphasized that because Christians are buried with Christ in baptism and raised from the dead to the glory of God the Father (Romans 6:4), that what Christ fulfilled in the Sabbath requires not one day each week, but rather "requires the whole course of our lives, until being completely dead to ourselves, we are filled with the life of God."  Calvin taught that spiritual wisdom deserves to have some part of every day devoted to it, but owing to the weakness of many daily meetings cannot be held.  Consequently, the pattern of weekly observance established by God is useful for the church to emulate.  This church practice is not to be in the manner of Jewish observance of minute formalities, but rather one of ordering church life in a useful and predictable manner to serve the body with opportunity to hear the word, receive the sacraments, and participate in public prayer.

Andreas Karlstadt a German Protestant theologian, University of Wittenberg chancellor, a contemporary of Martin Luther and a reformer of the early Reformation, defended the observance of the Sabbath, the seventh day of the week, as a holy day to the Lord. His defense of the Sabbath, and others among the Anabaptists, caused him to be censured as a Jew and a heretic.

The Westminster Confession of Faith describes the Sabbath day as being the seventh day of the week from the creation until the resurrection of Christ, and as being changed to the first day of the week with Christ's resurrection.

Methodist views 

In Methodism, an "important aspect of the pursuit of sanctification is the careful following" of the Ten Commandments. The General Rules of the Methodist Church required "attending upon all the ordinances of God" including "the public worship of God" and prohibited "profaning the day of the Lord, either by doing ordinary work therein or by buying or selling". As such, "Methodist observance of the Lord's Day was grounded in their sense that the observance of Sunday as a day of rest fulfilled the Commandement to sanctify the Sabbath." The 2014 Discipline of the Bible Methodist Connection of Churches states, with regard to the Lord's Day:

Theologically speaking, for Methodists, Sunday is "the special but not the only day for worship, it is hallowed by God, recalls creation and the resurrection, requires release from earthly toil and responsibilities, and anticipates the eschatological day of the Lord that is the hope and desire of all believers."

Latter-day Saints views 
Members of the Church of Jesus Christ of Latter-day Saints believe the Lord has commanded them to continue to observe the Sabbath. He has promised them that if they obey this commandment, they will receive "the fullness of the earth.". Members are taught that they should keep it a holy day and it should be reserved for holy activities.  Latter-day Saints attend sacrament meeting each week, which includes the ordinance of partaking of bread and water in remembrance of the Lord Jesus Christ as He instructed his apostles to do at the Last Supper. Other Sabbath-day activities may include: praying, meditating, studying the scriptures and the teachings of latter-day prophets, reading wholesome material, spending time with family, visiting the sick and distressed, and attending other Church meetings.

Seventh-day Adventists 
Seventh-day Adventists observe the sabbath from Friday sunset to Saturday sunset. In places where the sun does not appear or does not set for several months, such as northern Scandinavia, the tendency is to regard an arbitrary time such as 6 p.m. as "sunset". During the sabbath, Adventists avoid secular work and business, although medical relief and humanitarian work is excepted. Though there are cultural variations, most Adventists also avoid activities such as shopping, sport, and certain forms of entertainment. Adventists typically gather for church services on Saturday morning. Some also gather on Friday evening to welcome in the sabbath hours (sometimes called "vespers" or "opening Sabbath"), and some similarly gather at "closing Sabbath".

Traditionally, Seventh-day Adventists hold that the Ten Commandments (including the fourth commandment concerning the sabbath) are part of the moral law of God, not abrogated by the teachings of Jesus Christ, which apply equally to Christians.  Adventists have traditionally distinguished between "moral law" and "ceremonial law", arguing that moral law continues to bind Christians, while events predicted by the ceremonial law were fulfilled by Christ's death on the cross.

See also
 Sunday shopping

Notes

Further reading
The Jewish Study Bible, Tanakh Translation. 2004. Berlin, Adele; Brettler, Marc  Zvi; Fishbane, Michael, eds. Jewish Publication Society, New York: Oxford University Press. 
Matthew Henry's Concise Commentary on the Whole Bible (accessed 2 September 2009)
The Holy Bible, English Standard Version. 2007. Crossway Bibles, Wheaton, IL. 
New Jerusalem Bible. 1985. (accessed 28 August 2009)
The NIV Study Bible. 1995. Barker, Kenneth, Burdick, Donald; Stek, John; Wessel, Walter; Youngblood, Ronald, eds. Zondervan. Grand Rapids, MI, USA 
U.S. Catholic Church. Catechism of the Catholic Church. 2003. Doubleday Religion.  (accessed 1 September 2009)
"Luther on the Creation: A Critical and Devotional Commentary on Genesis [1-3]" 1904 Lutherans in all Lands, Co., Minneapolis, MN.

External links
 Tanakh (Holy Scriptures), Jewish Publication Society (JPS) 1917
Explanation of Torah, Mishnah, Talmud versions
 Brief explanations of Talmudic works and their origins
Catechism of the Catholic Church
New Jerusalem Bible (Catholic) 
  Matthew Henry's Concise Commentary on the Whole Bible
 John Wesley's notes on the Bible
John Calvin's commentary on the Bible
Bible Gateway online reading and research tool; several versions are available
Judaism 101 Love and Brotherhood

Ten Commandments
Jewish law and rituals
Book of Exodus
Biblical phrases
Jewish ethics
Christian ethics in the Bible
Sabbath
Shabbat